Ahmad Tea is a tea company based in Chandler's Ford, Hampshire, England. It sells a range of tea bags, specialty teas and gifts including: black tea, green tea, flavoured teas, and herbal teas. The company moved from London to a new headquarters in Chandler's Ford in 2010.

History
The company was founded in 1986 by Rahim Afshar and his brothers, named after their father.

Ahmad Tea distributes to over 80 countries on six continents, where it can be found in selected restaurants, hotels, specialty shops as well as some chains. Ahmad Tea’s headquarters also contains a tea museum, which attracts local guests. Ahmad Tea earned over 20 Great Taste Awards for various products.

Ahmad Tea is a member of the Ethical Tea Partnership, a not-for-profit organization created by a group of tea companies to address supply chain challenges to the tea industry in a sustainable fashion.

In 2012, in partnership with U Support charity, Ahmad Tea donated its range of teas to ChariTeas, a branded tea room in Hampshire, whose proceeds go to supporting disabled children. In 2013, Ahmad Tea was awarded the ethical investor of the year award for its charitable initiatives in the UK and support of orphanages in Mali, Russia, Sri Lanka and Ukraine.

See also
 Ethical Tea Partnership
 List of tea companies in the United Kingdom

References

External links 

 
 UK Tea & Infusions Association profile

Tea brands in the United Kingdom
Tea companies of the United Kingdom
British brands
Companies based in Hampshire
1986 establishments in the United Kingdom